Ofer Dikovsky better known by his stage name Oforia (in ) is an electronic music artist and music producer from Israel and one of Israel's longest standing electronic music artists. He has been active internationally, creating the first form of the dominant Israeli electronic sound. Because of his work, he is considered one of the inventors of the genre in Israel. Besides having a solo career as Oforia or Ofer Di, he has been involved with various musical groups/formations such as Indoor, Tandu and OB1, and has worked on several musical projects such as Pigs in Space and Phreaky.

Biography
Ofer Dikovsky was a member of the famous Goa-trance band Indoor with Avi Algarnati and Marko Goren. Their album Progressive Trance, released in 1995, was one of the first in the wave of trance-artist albums. After the group disbanded, he continued with Marco Goren to form Tandu, another band that made its mark with Ofer's solo track "Alien Pump". Working once more with Indoor, along with DJ Dino Psaras, on the "Phreaky" project, Ofer helped create the 1997 hit "Tornado," which charted at No. 23 in the UK Indie Charts. 

Subsequently, Ofer began working as a solo artist under various names. He started as Oforia, becoming one of the first Israeli artists to be signed to a UK label (Dragonfly) and the result was his 1998 debut album Delirious. The album established Ofer's unique sound and brought him international fame.

Simultaneously, Dikovsky ran two other side projects. One project was with Solaris and culminated in the single "Out There" / "Extra Mundane," a 12" release that was featured in many compilations. The other project, a dance-floor success, was a full-length concept album, Pigs in Space, released in 1998.

In 1999, Oforia released his second solo studio Off The Ground, featuring various styles of trance – psychedelic, progressive, ambient and industrial. The album was considered pioneering and "ahead of its time". The next Oforia album was Let It Beat and circulated on the psytrance scene in 2002. Headed for Infinity was promoted with 12"-vinyl single release, and was two remixes from G.M.S. and Violet Vision of "Northern Lights".

The next album, released in 2006 under the title Inner Twist, was considered one of his best musical outputs and contains tracks "Spiders," "Inner Twist," "Adrenaline," "Show No Mercy" and "Return of the Machines." The latter was an international hit made in collaboration with Bwicked.

Oforia has remixed artists like Infected Mushroom, GMS, Violet Vision, Atomic Pulse, Time Lock, Moshic, Fatali and more. In 2007, he joined forces with B-wicked (real name Bertin Katz) to form a dance/rock project named OB1. Their first album Dream Dictionary was released on Sonicult Music and was followed by two further EP releases.

In 2010, after releasing as Oforia his down-beat album Textures, Dikovsky made a turn towards progressive/tech house and started producing and releasing under the brand Ofer Di.

In 2015, Ofer Dikovsky made a full comeback to the trance scene and, as Oforia, released new psy-/Goa- trance music alongside his old-time Indoor collaborators, which included Avi Algranati (known, more recently, for "Space Cat"). He also revived, together with DJ Dede, the label MDMA Music, which releases all his latest music.

Discography

Albums
1995: Indoor – Progressive Trance
1997: Tandu – Multimoods
1998: Oforia – Delirious
1998: Oforia – Pigs in Space
1999: Oforia – Off The Ground
2002: Oforia – Let It Beat
2005: Oforia – Headed for Infinity
2006: Oforia – Inner Twist
2008: Oforia – Arcadia – The Remixes Album
2009: OB1 (Oforia & B-wicked) – Dream Dictionary
2009: Oforia – Textures
2016: Oforia – Read More

EP
2000: Oforia – Raw
2002: Oforia – Millions of Miles Away
2006: Oforia – Northern Lights
2008: Oforia – Return of the Machines
2009: OB1 – Behind the Wheel EP
2009: OB1 – Ride on EP
2009: Oforia - Exit

2010: Ofer Di - Feel
2010: Ofer Di - I Want
2010: Ofer Di - Get Up
2011: Ofer Di Ft Doreen - Leave again
2011: Ofer Di & Matan Caspi - On A Plane
2011: Ofer Di & Matan Caspi - Over Come
2011: Ofer Di Ft Doreen - Its All About You
2012: Ofer Di - Your Rhythm
2012: Ofer Di - Primal Instinct
2012: Sebastian Krieg, Weekend Heroes Ft Ofer Di & Doreen - over The World

2015: Indoor - Mind Altering
2015: Oforia - Venus
2015: Oforia Ft Dede - The Looking glass of Alice

Compilations
2007: Oforia – CyberDog Vol 4 Psi-Fi Systems Mixed by Oforia

References

External links

Offiria Official Web Page
Oforia Myspace Page
OB1 Official website
OB1 Myspace
Oforia Discogs
Oforia LastFM

1971 births
Living people
Israeli musicians
Israeli psychedelic trance musicians
Israeli electronic musicians